The 2015 British Athletics Championships was the national championship in outdoor track and field for athletes in the United Kingdom, held from 3–5 July 2015 at Alexander Stadium in Birmingham. It was organised by UK Athletics. A full range of outdoor events were held. The competition served as the selection event for the 2015 World Championships in Athletics.

Medal summary

Men

Women

References 

British Outdoor Championships
British Athletics Championships
Athletics Outdoor
British Athletics Championships
Sports competitions in Birmingham, West Midlands